The 1805 Vermont gubernatorial election for Governor of Vermont took place throughout September, and resulted in the re-election of Isaac Tichenor to a one-year term.

The Vermont General Assembly met in Danville on October 10. The Vermont House of Representatives appointed a committee to examine the votes of the freemen of Vermont for governor, lieutenant governor, treasurer, and members of the governor's council.

The committee examined the votes, which showed that Isaac Tichenor was chosen for a ninth one-year term. In the election for lieutenant governor, the voters selected Paul Brigham for a tenth one-year term. Benjamin Swan was elected to a sixth one-year term as treasurer. According to contemporary newspaper accounts, the vote totals for governor were as follows.

In the races for lieutenant governor and treasurer, the totals were not recorded, but Brigham was reported to have won by a majority of 5,590. Swan's majority was 3,440.

Results

References

Vermont gubernatorial elections
gubernatorial
Vermont